The European Film Awards (or European Film Academy Awards) have been presented annually since 1988 by the European Film Academy to recognize excellence in European cinematic achievements. The awards are given in 19 categories, of which the most important is the Best Film. They are restricted to European cinema and European producers, directors, and actors. The awards were officially also called the "Felix Awards" until 1997, in reference to the former award's trophy statuette, which was replaced by a feminine statuette.

Since 1997, the European Film Awards have been held in early- to mid-December. Hosting duties have alternated between Berlin, Germany in odd-numbered years and other European cities in even-numbered years. The most recent European Film Awards were held on 12 December 2020 as a virtual ceremony. In reaction to the 2022 Russian invasion of Ukraine, Russian films were excluded from the 2022 European Film Awards.

Awarding procedures
Feature films participating in the European Film Awards must be European feature-length fiction films intended for normal theatrical release which must have had their first official screening (be it at a festival or at a regular cinema) after 1 July of the year before.
Based on a selection of approximately 40 films recommended for a nomination, the members of the European Film Academy vote for the nominations in the main categories, which are announced in early November at the Seville European Film Festival. Based on the nominations, the members of the European Film Academy then vote for the winners which are announced at the European Film Awards Ceremony in early December.

Controversies
The European Film Academy (EFA) Awards’ Best Film winner, Melancholia became the third Lars von Trier film to win EFA’s top award, following Breaking the Waves (1996) and Dancer in the Dark (2000) – this despite the fact that the filmmaker became embroiled in a nasty controversy after making jokes about Jews and Adolf Hitler at that year’s Cannes Film Festival.

Eligibility
The criteria whereby a film qualifies as European are based upon the European Convention on Cinematographic Co-production, Appendix II, issued by the Council of Europe. This definition might be extended for Israeli and Palestinian works and nationalities. A cinematographic work qualifies as European if it achieves at least 16 points (out of 21).

The European Film Academy uses a lower minimum of 13 points.

Host cities

European Capital of Culture event

Up through the 2018 ceremony, 15 cities in 10 countries have hosted the contest. Berlin has been host 14 times, Potsdam 3 times, and Paris 2 times. Barcelona, Bochum, Copenhagen, Glasgow, London, Riga, Rome, Seville, Tallinn, Valletta, Warsaw, and Wroclaw, have each hosted once.

Award categories

Current categories
 Best Film
 Best Comedy
 European Discovery
 Best Animated Feature Film
 Best Short Film
 Best Documentary Film
 Best Director
 Best Actor
 Best Actress
 Best Composer
 Best Editor
 Best Screenwriter
 Best Production Designer
 Best Cinematographer
 Best European Co-Production
 Best Sound Designer
 Best Costume Designer
 Best Makeup and Hairstyling
 Best Visual Effects

Audience awards
 Audience Award for Best Film
 Young Audience Award
 University Award (Student's Choice)

Special awards
 Lifetime Achievement
 Achievement in World Cinema

Defunct awards
 Best Non-European Film
 Best Young Film
 Best Supporting Actor
 Best Supporting Actress
 Best Supporting Performance
 Best Young Actor or Actress
 People's Choice Award Best Actor
 People's Choice Award Best Actress
 People's Choice Award Best Director
 Prix d'Excellence
 Critics Award
 Award of Merit
 Honorary Award
 Special Jury Award
 European Cinema Society Special Award
 Special Mention

Proposed awards
 Best Animated Short Subject
 Best Live Action Short Subject
 Best Documentary Short Subject
 Best Music Video
 Best Cast
 Best Action or Adventure Film
 Best Sound Editing
 Best Sound Mixing
 Best Screenwriter - Adapted 
 Best Screenwriter - Original 
 Best Costume Designer in Contemporary Film
 Best Costume Designer in Historic Film
 Best Costume Designer in Unreal World (Sci-Fi/Fantasy) Film
 Best Production Designer in Contemporary Film
 Best Production Designer in Historic Film
 Best Production Designer in Unreal World (Sci-Fi/Fantasy) Film
 Best Makeup and Hairstylist in Contemporary Film
 Best Makeup and Hairstylist in Historic Film
 Best Makeup and Hairstylist in Unreal World (Sci-Fi/Fantasy) Film
 Best Choreographer
 Best Original Song
 Best Poster
 Best Stunt Ensemble
 Best Actor – Series
 Best Actress – Series
 Best African Film
 Best Latin American Film
 Best North American Film
 Best Asian Film
 Best Middle East and North Africa Film
 Best Australia and Pacific Film

Timeline

<noinclude>

Category included in the cumulative category named Award of Excellence or Artistic Contribution Achievement
Category included in the Production Designer category
Critics choice transferred to European Discovery
People's Choice transferred to European Parliaments Lux Prize Audience Film Award

Films with multiple wins 

8 wins
 The Favourite (2019)
6 wins
 Good Bye, Lenin! (2003)
The Ghost Writer (2010)
 The Square (2017)
 Cold War (2018+2019)
5 wins
 Talk to Her (2002)
 Caché (2005)
 Volver (2006)
 Gomorrah (2008)
 Ida (2014)
 Toni Erdmann (2016)
4 wins
 Open Doors (1990)
 Toto the Hero (1991)
 Dancer in the Dark (2000)
 Amélie (2001)
 Amour (2012)
 The Great Beauty (2013)
 Another Round (2020)
 Quo Vadis, Aida? (2021+2022)
 Triangle of Sadness (2022)
3 wins
 Sunshine (1999)
 High Hopes (1989)
 The Northerners (1992)
 Les Amants du Pont-Neuf (1992)
 Breaking the Waves (1996)
 All About My Mother (1999)
 Sophie Scholl – The Final Days (2005)
 The Lives of Others (2006)
 The White Ribbon (2009)
 The King's Speech (2011)
 Melancholia (2011)
 Youth (2015)
 Land of Mine (2016)
 Dogman (2018)
 Flee (2021)

See also
 Lux Prize
 Film Award of the Council of Europe
 Prix Europa
 European Union MEDIA Prize
 MTV Europe Music Awards
 European Border Breakers Award

References

External links

Voting website for the People's Choice Award

 
European film awards
Lists of films by award
Awards established in 1988